Uplifter is the ninth studio album by American rock band 311, released on June 2, 2009 by Volcano Records.  It is the band's first album in nearly four years, the longest gap between albums in 311's career.  Uplifter was produced by Bob Rock, who has produced or engineered albums by numerous notable acts, such as Metallica, Aerosmith, Mötley Crüe, Bon Jovi, The Cult, Our Lady Peace and The Offspring. It debuted at #3 on the Billboard 200, their highest position to date.

Release and reception
The first single from the album, "Hey You", was sent to radio stations for airplay on April 7, and was officially released April 10, 2009.

Before the official release date, Uplifter was streamed in full (including the deluxe edition tracks) on the band's MySpace page and was featured on Playlist.com.

Uplifter has received mixed reactions from critics. Andrew Leahey of Allmusic gave it a generally favorable review and said that Uplifter "...[wields] a polished mix of tour-worthy anthems and lighter-hoisting ballads that seem destined to fare better in concert than on record."

It has received criticism as well. Talking about the lyrics, Laina Dawes of Consequence of Sound said, "...don’t look for any insightful wisdom here. ... Then again, how important are lyrics in this genre, or even this modern day age of Britney Spears and Lady Gaga? In comparison to that schlock, this is pure poetry."

Colin Moriarty of IGN reviewed each of the songs from Uplifter one-by-one. He said that while some show 311 maturing musically, there are still songs for the hardcore fans.  Moriarty noted that his favorite song from the album was "Get Down," saying, "311 songs with a message and a hard-hitting rap-rock sound have become increasingly rare since the days of Soundsystem and From Chaos, and Get Down is certainly a welcome addition to Uplifter's roster of songs."

The Record Review noted "that after a couple of somewhat lackluster releases (2003’s Evolver and 2005’s Don’t Tread On Me) and a subsequent extended break, 311 has returned with a record that is full of life."

Track listing

Bonus tracks

Personnel
Credits adapted from album’s liner notes.

311
 Nick Hexum – vocals, rhythm guitar, keyboards
 SA Martinez – vocals, turntables
 Chad Sexton – drums, backing vocals on "Daisy Cutter" and "Jackpot"
 Tim Mahoney – lead guitar, backing vocals on "Daisy Cutter" and "Jackpot"
 Aaron Wills – bass, backing vocals on "Daisy Cutter" and "Jackpot"

Additional Musicians
 Adam Merrin – piano on "Too Much Too Fast"
 Native Wayne Jobson – intro narration on "Never Ending Summer"

Production
 Bob Rock – producer, mixing
 Eric Helmkamp – engineer
 Giff Tripp – assistant engineer
 Jason Walters – Hive Studio manager
 George Marino – mastering

Chart performance

Album

Singles

References

2009 albums
Volcano Entertainment albums
311 (band) albums
Albums produced by Bob Rock